Al-Mansur Ali (epithet: al-Malik al-Manṣūr Nūr ad-dīn ʾAlī ibn Aybak,) (b. c. 1242, Cairo) was the second of the Mamluk Sultans of Egypt in the Turkic, or Bahri, line. Some historians, however, consider Shajar al-Durr as the first of the Mamluk Sultans; thus, to them Al-Mansur Ali was the third Mamluk Sultan and not the second.  He ruled from 1257 to 1259 after the assassination of his father Aybak during a turbulent period that witnessed the Mongols invasion of the Islamic world.

References

Bibliography
 Shayal, Jamal, Prof. of Islamic history, Tarikh Misr al-Islamiyah (History of Islamic Egypt), dar al-Maref, Cairo 1266, 

Bahri sultans
Egyptian nobility
Monarchs deposed as children
Medieval child monarchs
1242 births
Year of death missing
13th-century Mamluk sultans